Gonzalo Ucha Fernández (born February 7, 1985) is an Argentine footballer.

References
 
 Profile at BDFA 

1984 births
Living people
Argentine footballers
Association football forwards
Liga I players
Chilean Primera División players
Venezuelan Primera División players
Primera B de Chile players
Kakkonen players
Serie D players
Benidorm CF footballers
FC Progresul București players
CSM Ceahlăul Piatra Neamț players
Sportivo Italiano footballers
Deportivo Anzoátegui players
Cobreloa footballers
Savona F.B.C. players
Kultsu FC players
Deportes Concepción (Chile) footballers
Nuorese Calcio players
Coquimbo Unido footballers
FC Encamp players
Argentine expatriate footballers
Argentine expatriate sportspeople in Spain
Expatriate footballers in Spain
Argentine expatriate sportspeople in Chile
Expatriate footballers in Chile
Argentine expatriate sportspeople in Romania
Expatriate footballers in Romania
Argentine expatriate sportspeople in Venezuela
Expatriate footballers in Venezuela
Argentine expatriate sportspeople in Italy
Expatriate footballers in Italy
Argentine expatriate sportspeople in Finland
Expatriate footballers in Finland
Argentine expatriate sportspeople in Andorra
Expatriate footballers in Andorra
Footballers from Buenos Aires